Archie Edward Heath (6 August 1887 – 18 May 1961) was a philosopher and philosophy professor. Alongside his contemporary Ludwig Wittgenstein, he significantly influenced the 'Swansea School of Philosophy'. He was President of the Rationalist Press Association 1949-1954.

Career 
Heath was a teacher at Oundle School, and subsequently science master at Bedales School, where one of the students he encouraged was Robin Hill, who went on to be a plant biochemist. He was later a lecturer at the universities of Manchester and Liverpool.

From 1925-52, Heath was Professor of Philosophy at University College, Swansea. While there, he was an influence on both American philosopher Rush Rhees (who worked as an assistant professor alongside Heath) and British philosopher Peter Winch.

A humanist, Heath was a Director of the Rationalist Press Association 1946 to 1958; its President 1949-54, and Vice President from 1955 until his death. Heath was the editor of Scientific Thought in the Twentieth Century, published in 1951. This contained contributions from high profile thinkers including A. J. Ayer, Ronald Fisher, Peter Medawar, and Sir Harold Spencer Jones. Albert Einstein, wrote Rationalist Press Association's Board of Directors congratulating them on the volume.

Heath wrote the introduction to Susan Stebbing's Ideals and Illusions, published as part of the Thinker's Library in 1948 (first published in 1941). He described Stebbing as someone who had "scared academic persons because she not only professed rationality but also lived it. She made criticism an act of grace."

Death 
Heath's funeral was conducted at Swansea by H. J. Blackham, who quoted Heath's words during the humanist ceremony: "The study of human beings, in all their complex doings between a sleep and a sleep, is an endless source of interest and puzzlement."

References

External links 

 A. E. Heath at WorldCat

1887 births
1961 deaths
English philosophers
English humanists
Academics of Swansea University